Árpád Fremond (born 4 December 1981) is a Serbian politician from the country's Hungarian community. He served in the National Assembly of Serbia from 2008 to 2022 as a member of the Alliance of Vojvodina Hungarians (Vajdasági Magyar Szövetség, VMSZ). He became the leader of Serbia's Hungarian National Council in December 2022.

Early life and private career
Fremond was born in Bačka Topola, in what was then the Socialist Autonomous Province of Vojvodina in the Socialist Republic of Serbia, Socialist Federal Republic of Yugoslavia. Raised in the nearby village of Pačir, he earned a degree from Bačka Topola's agricultural college in 2000 as a veterinary technician. He later graduated from the University of Novi Sad (Subotica branch) Faculty of Teacher training in Sombor, and in 2010–11 he earned a master's degree from the same institution.

Politician

Early years (2000–08)
Fremond became a member of the VMSZ in 2000 and was a founding member of its youth wing. He appeared on the party's electoral lists for the Assembly of Vojvodina in the 2004 provincial election and the Bačka Topola municipal assembly in the concurrent local elections, although he did not receive a mandate to serve at either level.

He first sought election to the national assembly in the 2007 Serbian parliamentary election, receiving the fifth position on the VMSZ's list. The party won three seats, and he was not given a mandate. (From 2000 to 2011, Serbian parliamentary mandates were awarded to sponsoring parties or coalitions rather than to individual candidates, and it was common practice for the mandates to be assigned out of numerical order. Fremond's specific list position had no formal bearing on his chances of election.)

Parliamentarian (2008–2022)

Cvetković administration (2008–2012)
The VMSZ led led an electoral alliance called the Hungarian Coalition in the 2008 Serbian parliamentary election. The coalition's list won four seats, all of which were awarded to VMSZ candidates; Fremond appeared on the list and, this time, was assigned a mandate. He also appeared on the Hungarian Coalition's list for Bačka Topola in the 2008 local elections. As in 2004, he did not take a seat at the local level.

The 2008 parliamentary election results were inconclusive, but the For a European Serbia alliance eventually formed a coalition government with the Socialist Party of Serbia (Socijalistička partija Srbije, SPS), and the VMSZ provided crucial support to the administration in parliament. In his first term, Fremond was a member of the committees on agriculture and local self-government; a deputy member of the education committee; a deputy member of the committee on labour, veterans' affairs, and social affairs; a deputy member of the committee on development and international economic relations; and a member of the parliamentary friendship groups with Austria, Romania, and Slovenia.

Dačić and Vučić administrations (2012–2017)
Serbia's electoral system was reformed in 2011, such that all mandates were awarded in numerical order to candidates on successful lists. Fremond was given the fourth position on the VMSZ's list for the 2012 parliamentary election and was re-elected when the list won five mandates. The Serbian Progressive Party (Srpska napredna stranks, SNS) won a plurality victory in the election and afterward formed a new coalition government with the SPS; the VMSZ declined an offer to join the government and served in opposition, at least nominally, for the next two years. Fremond was a member of the committee on agriculture, forestry, and water management; a deputy member of the committee on human and minority rights and gender equality; and a member of the friendship groups with Hungary and Slovenia.

He again received the fourth position on the VMSZ list for the 2014 parliamentary election and was re-elected when the list won six mandates. In this term, the party began offering support to Serbia's SNS-led administration. Fremond was promoted to deputy chair of the agriculture committee and was a deputy member of the committee on finance, budget, and control of public spending; a deputy member of the committee on education, science, technological development, and the information society; and, as before, a member of the friendship groups with Hungary and Slovenia.

For the 2016 parliamentary election, Fremond was promoted to third on the VMSZ list and was re-elected when the list won four seats. He held the same committee assignments as in the previous parliament and also served as a deputy member of the committee on the rights of the child. In this term, he was a member of the friendship groups with Croatia and Hungary.

Brnabić administration (2017–2022)
The VMSZ led a successful drive to increase its voter turnout in the 2020 Serbian parliamentary election and won a record nine seats. Fremond, who once again appeared in the third list position, was elected to a fifth term. He continued to serve as deputy chair of the agricultural committee; was a deputy member of the committee on constitutional and legal issues, the health and family committee, and the environmental protection committee; and was a member of the friendship groups with Croatia, the Czech Republic, and Hungary. Fremond also received the sixth position on the VMSZ's list for Bačka Topola in the concurrent 2020 Serbian local elections and was elected to the municipal parliament when the list won a majority victory with nineteen out of thirty-five seats.

He once again appeared in the third position on the VMSZ's list in the 2022 parliamentary election and was re-elected even as the list fell back to five seats. He was a member of the agriculture committee and a deputy member of the education committee, the culture and information committee, and the committee on the judiciary, public administration, and local self-government.

In parliament, Fremond often spoke on issues pertaining to Vojvodina's farming and dairy-producing communities.

Leader of the Hungarian National Council
Fremond led the Hungarian Unity list in the 2022 election for Serbia's Hungarian National Council  The outcome of the election was not in doubt; no other lists participated, and Hungarian Unity won all thirty-five available seats. Fremond resigned from the national assembly on 8 December 2022 and was chosen as president of the Hungarian National Council on 16 December.

References

1981 births
Living people
People from Bačka Topola
Hungarians in Vojvodina
Members of the National Assembly (Serbia)
Members of the Hungarian National Council (Serbia)
Alliance of Vojvodina Hungarians politicians